Jana Bode (born 1 March 1969) is a German luger who competed from the late 1980s to the late 1990s.

Born in Rochlitz, she won five medals at the FIL World Luge Championships, including one gold (Women's singles: 1996), two silvers (Women's singles: 1997, Mixed team: 1996), and two bronzes (Women's singles: 1990, 1991).

Bode also won six medals at the FIL European Luge Championships with two golds (Women's singles: 1996, Mixed team: 1996), three silvers (Women's singles: 1994, Mixed team: 1990, 1994), and one bronze (Women's singles: 1990).

She finished 14th in the women's singles event at the 1994 Winter Olympics in Lillehammer.

Bode won the overall Luge World Cup title in women's singles in 1995-6.

References
Hickok sports information on World champions in luge and skeleton.
Ilmenau.com profile on Bode.
List of European luge champions 
List of women's singles luge World Cup champions since 1978.
SportQuick.com information on World champions in luge. 

1969 births
Living people
People from Rochlitz
German female lugers
Lugers at the 1994 Winter Olympics
Olympic lugers of Germany
National People's Army military athletes
20th-century German women
Sportspeople from Saxony